Hub Dam Wildlife Sanctuary is located around Hub Dam in Balochistan and Sindh Provinces of Pakistan.

The greater part of this wildlife sanctuary in Balochistan is unprotected; the eastern shore and area south of the Dam in Sindh are protected in the Kirthar National Park and Hub Dam Wildlife Sanctuary respectively. The lake formed by the dam covers an area of 32 square miles and is an ideal place for bird watching. There is plenty of waterfowl in the lake, both resident and migratory. 

The surrounding hills are the home of urial, Sindh ibex, four-horned antelope, Indian wolf, Golden jackal, Bengal fox, Indian pangolin and numerous other birds and reptiles.

References

Wildlife sanctuaries of Pakistan
Protected areas of Balochistan, Pakistan
Protected areas of Sindh